This is a list of international rugby league matches played throughout 2016. A † denotes a recognised, but unofficial match that did not contribute to the IRL World Rankings.

Men

January 
No international matches scheduled.

February

March 
No international matches scheduled.

April 
No international matches scheduled.

May 

Notes:
 This was the first of the two 2016 Pacific Rugby League Tests.
 The win was Papua New Guinea's first win on foreign soil since the 2000 World Cup.
 With the victory, Papua New Guinea now hold the Melanesian Cup shield.
 Rod Griffin made his 10th test appearance for Papua New Guinea.
 James Storer made his 10th test appearance for Fiji.
 Justin Olam, Stargroth Amean, Watson Boas, Henry Wan and Kurt Baptiste made their international debuts for Papua New Guinea while Etuate Qionimacawa, Sitiveni Moceidreke, Maurice Kennedy, Ben Nakubuwai, Tui Kamikamica, Tevita Cottrell and Jokatama Dokonivalu made their international debuts for Fiji.

Notes:
 This was the second of the two 2016 Pacific Rugby League Tests.
 With the victory, Samoa retain the Polynesian Cup shield.
 Leeson Ah Mau made his 10th test appearance for Samoa.
 Kirisome Auva'a, Fa'amanu Brown, Erin Clark, Junior Paulo, Kaysa Pritchard, Raymond Faitala-Mariner and John Asiata made their international debuts for Samoa while David Fusitu'a, Patrick Kaufusi and Sione Katoa made their international debuts for Tonga.

June 

Notes
 This was the first ever 13-aside match both teams ever played as they regularly play 9-aside matches against each other and fellow Latin Heat-based nations.

Notes:
 This was the first Mediterranean Cup since 2004.
 Both nations fielded a total of 12 debutants each.

July 

Notes:
This was a part of the 2016 Nordic Cup.
This was the first time ever that the Nordic Cup only featured two countries, after Denmark withdrew from the tournament.
It was Norway's first Nordic Cup win since 2012.

Notes:
This was a part of the 2016 America's Cup.

Notes:
This was a part of the 2016 America's Cup.
Former NRL player, Taioalo 'Junior' Vaivai, made his International debut for the United States.

August 

Notes
 With the win, Germany retained the Griffin Cup.

Notes:
This was a part of the 2016 Ohana Cup.

Notes:
This was a part of the 2016 Ohana Cup.

September 

Notes:
This was a part of the 2016 America's Cup.
Also played as part of the Colonial Cup.

October

November 

With the win Italy became the 14th, and final, team to qualify for the 2017 World Cup.

December 
No international matches scheduled.

Women

See also 
 2016 Rugby League Four Nations

References 

2016 in rugby league
Rugby league-related lists